The men's 3000 metres at the 2018 IAAF World Indoor Championships took place on 2 and 4 March 2018.

Summary
With more lane violations being called even as they would be less significant in a race of this distance, four were disqualified in the heats, most notably Olympic silver medalist Paul Chelimo, jostled into taking one step inside the rail.

The final began at a jog, with first Yassin Bouih stepping out to the lead, then Clemens Bleistein to lead the race through at 1:14.58 first 400.  The three Ethiopian runners all went to the back of the pack.  Davis Kiplangat moved to the front but didn't really push the pace.  After another lap, Adel Mechaal took the point, the next 400 accomplished even slower in at 1:15.12.  Mechaal took the field through another slightly faster 400 in 1:12.12 as the Ethiopians at the back began to get impatient.  Hagos Gebrhiwet began to move forward in the pack, then Yomif Kejelcha joined him.  Towards the end of the next 400, Selemon Barega made a big move to sweep toward the front.  With the acceleration, the Kenyans and ex-pat Shadrack Kipchirchir moved forward, Kejelcha taking over the lead.  Mechaal came back to re-join the mix, then Barega made a big move to reach Kejelcha's shoulder, an Ethiopian wall at the front.  Gebrhiwet then came forward on the outside, closing the box on the pursuers Kipchirchir and exchanging elbows with Mechaal.  Gebrhiwet continued to move forward to second position.  The three Ethiopians continued to accelerate, their strategic box broken into a line at the front.  Free to move, Bethwell Birgen ran past Barega at the bell while Kejelcha was breaking free off the front.  Down the final backstretch Birgen passed the fading Gebrhiwet.  As Kejelcha extended his lead on to victory, Barega passed Gebrhiwet on the final turn, then launched his final sprint past a struggling Birgen who barely held off a resurgent Gebrhiwet and Mechaal for bronze.

Results

Heats
The heats were started on 2 March at 12:55.

Final

The final was started on 4 March  at 15:35.

References

3000 metres
3000 metres at the World Athletics Indoor Championships